Vartiania is a genus of moths in the family Cossidae.

Species
 Vartiania drangianicus (Grum-Grshimailo, 1902)
 Vartiania muscula (Rothschild, 1912)
 Vartiania sapho Yakovlev, 2007
 Vartiania senganensis (Daniel, 1949)
 Vartiania zaratustra Yakovlev, 2004

References

 , 2004: Two new genera of Carpenter Moths from the Palaearctic (Lepidoptera: Cossidae). Atalanta 35 (3/4): 357-368.
 , 2007: New species of Palearctic carpenter-moths (Lepidoptera: Cossidae). Eversmannia 10(2007): 3-23. Full article: 

Cossinae